The Mahindra Bolero Neo (Formerly Mahindra TUV 300) is a mini SUV manufactured by the Indian automaker Mahindra & Mahindra since 2015.

History

The TUV300 was first announced by Mahindra & Mahindra in August 2015, the microsite of the vehicle went live by the same month. The vehicle was officially launched on September 10, 2015 in Madhya Pradesh. The TUV300 is designed by Mahindra's Design Studio in Mumbai, with the product engineering being done at Mahindra Research Valley in Chennai. It is built on the same platform as the Mahindra Scorpio. The TUV300 also employs the same mHawk engine series as the XUV500 and Scorpio but with a smaller engine displacement resulting in a lower engine power and torque.

Variants
The TUV300 BS4 is available in manual transmission and an automated manual transmission (AMT) known as Autoshift. There are in total seven trim levels available. Five trim levels use a manual transmission, while the last two uses an automated manual transmission.
In 2021 Bolero Neo Available in Manual Transmission only .The Bolero Neo has 3 Variants are N4, N8 and N10.

TUV300 Plus/Bolero Neo Plus
On June 20, 2018, the TUV300 Plus was launched. It is powered by a larger 2.2-litre mHawk engine that produces , 21 PS up on the standard TUV300. In 2021, Mahindra renamed TUV300 Plus as Bolero Neo Plus.

See also

 Mahindra XUV700
 Mahindra XUV300

References 

Mahindra Bolero NEO BS6 2.0 Update details

External links 
 

TUV300
Mini sport utility vehicles
Cars introduced in 2015
2010s cars